Luis Pérez González (1906–1963) was a Mexican football forward who made two appearances for the Mexico national team at the 1930 FIFA World Cup.

Honours
International
Central American and Caribbean Games Gold Medal (2): 1935, 1938

References

External links

Mexican footballers
Mexico international footballers
1930 FIFA World Cup players
1907 births
1962 deaths
Central American and Caribbean Games gold medalists for Mexico
Competitors at the 1935 Central American and Caribbean Games
Competitors at the 1938 Central American and Caribbean Games
Association football forwards
Central American and Caribbean Games medalists in football
20th-century Mexican people